UNIT is a fictional entity in Doctor Who. It first appeared in the Second Doctor serial The Invasion, (1968), although Alistair Gordon Lethbridge-Stewart had appeared earlier in The Web of Fear (1968) as a colonel.

A

Corporal Adams
Corporal Adams, played by Max Faulkner, is a corporal in UNIT, appearing in "The Android Invasion" (1975). He was based at the Space Defence Station near the village of Devesham when it was targeted by the alien Kraals, who plotted to use the returning astronaut Guy Crayford as a Trojan Horse against the human race. As part of their plan the Kraal scientist Stygron created an android duplicate of Adams among many others from the area but this developed faults and threw itself from a cliff, something witnessed by the Fourth Doctor and Sarah Jane Smith. The reappearance of Adams apparently unharmed in the duplicate Devesham's village pub greatly increased the pair's belief something was amiss. The real Adams briefly met the Fourth Doctor when he attempted to thwart the Kraal plans.

Actor Max Faulkner had previously played an unnamed UNIT soldier in Season 7 story "The Ambassadors of Death".

B
Brigadier Winifred Bambera, played by Angela Bruce, appeared in the Seventh Doctor serial Battlefield (1989) as UNIT's commanding officer. She works alongside the Seventh Doctor, Ace and Brigadier Lethbridge-Stewart in defeating the extra-dimensional forces of Morgaine and Mordred in Carbury. She is in command during the mid-1990s and is tasked with transporting a nuclear missile across Britain. Bambera is shown able to fight with weapons and in hand-to-hand combat. She takes a no-nonsense, by-the-book approach to command that warrants the respect of those under her. Major Husak and Sergeant Zbrigniev reports directly to her. She uses the word "shame" as an expletive.

Bambera appears briefly twice in the Virgin New Adventures novels, in Head Games (1995) and The Dying Days. It is revealed that she has married Ancelyn, the Arthurian knight from Battlefield, and that the couple have twins. She is mentioned as having served as a Colonel under Brigadier Crichton in the novelisation of Downtime (1996). Her later life is seen in the Prelude to Transit (where she holds the rank of General) and the short story "Excalibur of Mars" in the Bernice Summerfield anthology Present Danger (2010).

In the IDW comic The Forgotten (2008–09), the Ninth Doctor uses the name "Brigadier Bambera" as an alias when visiting World War I.

She reunites with the Seventh Doctor and Ace in the Big Finish Productions Lost Stories audio Animal (2011).

Corporal Bell
Corporal Bell, played by Fernanda Marlowe, is one of Brigadier Lethbridge-Stewart's administrative support staff. She appeared in the Third Doctor serials The Mind of Evil (1971) and The Claws of Axos (1971). In the Virgin Missing Adventures novel The Eye of the Giant (1996) by Christopher Bulis, her first name is given as Carol.

Sergeant Benton

Major Beresford

Major Beresford, played by John Acheson, is a major in UNIT, appearing in "The Seeds of Doom" (1976). With Brigadier Lethbridge-Stewart in to Geneva he was acting senior officer and was summoned by Sir Colin Thackeray at the World Ecology Bureau when the Krynoid was activated on Earth by Harrison Chase. Initially Beresford and Thackeray disbelieved the Fourth Doctor's predictions that the alien would cause plant life to become hostile to mankind until reports of just that happening began to came in. He dispatched Sergeant Henderson ahead with the Doctor to rescue Sarah Jane Smith and the mercenary Scorby from Chase's estate before arriving with a laser gun team himself. They found the weapons had no impact on the growing Krynoid, with Beresford calling in an RAF airstrike to deal with the creature once the Doctor and Sarah Jane had escaped.

Private Bryson

Private Bryson, played by Colin Bell, is a private in UNIT, appearing in "Invasion of the Dinosaurs" (1974). He served under Brigadier Lethbridge-Stewart when UNIT responded to a crisis in London caused by the inexplicable appearances of dinosaurs in the city. Bryson was not the most dynamic of soldiers and instead found a niche making tea for his superiors at the UNIT field headquarters. This proved lucky as he bumbled in with a tray of the beverage when Captain Mike Yates, part of the Operation Golden Age conspiracy, was holding the Third Doctor, the Brigadier and Sergeant Benton at gunpoint. Bryson's arrival gave Benton an opening to disarm Yates.

C

Major Cosworth
Major Cosworth, played by Patrick Godfrey, is one of Brigadier Lethbridge-Stewart's subordinates at UNIT. During the retaking of Stangmoor Prison as part of UNIT's attempts to recover a Thunderbolt missile he aided the Brigadier in planning the storming of the penitentiary, though his casual manner and lack of tact was not well-received by his commanding officer.

In the Virgin Missing Adventures novel The Scales of Injustice (1996) by Gary Russell, his first name is given as Alex.

D

The Doctor

UNIT's principal scientific advisor since his third incarnation was exiled to Earth (having periodically collaborated with UNIT during his second incarnation).  The Doctor departed from UNIT's full-time employment during his fourth incarnation, leaving a space-time telegraph (and, later, the TARDIS's telephone number) with which he could be summoned in emergencies. He retains his credentials, still bearing his third incarnation's portrait; and, initially, UNIT personnel Surgeon-Lieutenant Harry Sullivan and Sarah Jane Smith as his companions. Despite the looseness of his UNIT affiliation and his frequent disagreements with the organisation, the Doctor continues to consider UNIT's scientific advisor to be his job, even into his eleventh incarnation.

F

Colonel Faraday

Colonel Faraday, played by Patrick Newell, is a somewhat pompous colonel in UNIT, appearing in "The Android Invasion" (1975). With Brigadier Lethbridge-Stewart called away to Geneva he was acting commanding officer at the Space Defence Station near the village of Devesham when missing astronaut Guy Crayford prepared to return to Earth, being unwittingly used as a carrier for a lethal disease developed by the alien Kraals to destroy the human race. Having discovered the scheme the Fourth Doctor attempted to warn Faraday only to find he and several other key UNIT personnel at the base had already been replaced by Kraal-controlled android duplicates. The android Faraday was later deactivated by the Doctor, and the real Colonel was freed by Sarah Jane Smith.

G

Jo Grant

Jo Grant is a civilian employee of UNIT who was assigned as assistant to the Scientific Advisor, the Third Doctor. The character appears from the serial Terror of the Autons in 1971 until The Green Death in 1973. According to the novelisation of Terror of the Autons, she holds the rank of Corporal./

Grand Serpent

H

Private Carl Harris
Private Carl Harris played by Clive Standen codename "Greyhound 15", appeared in 3 episodes of Doctor Who fourth series. His first appearance in "The Sontaran Stratagem" and "The Poison Sky" (2008). He leads the UNIT operation into the ATMOS facility and teams up with Private Gray to secure the basement of the factory where they stumble across a cloning tank (complete with embryonic clone) and the Sontaran leader General Staal. Staal is impressed with Harris's courage, and declares him an "above average soldier" before disparaging Harris's heightist jokes against him and brainwashing Harris to act as a double agent for the Sontarans. He sets about capturing Martha Jones and assisting Commander Skorr with her cloning and then commandeering the TARDIS. Still hypnotised, he and Gray later reported to Skorr to fight alongside the Sontarans but are casually gunned down.

He returned in the episode "Turn Left" (2008), leading a UNIT operation in a parallel universe and announcing the Tenth Doctor's death during the events of the attempted Racnoss invasion, the events of which occurred previous to the Sontaran invasion.

On Page 129 of the reference book The Time Traveller's Almanac, Harris's first name is given as Carl.

Sergeant Hart

Sergeant Hart, played by Richard Steele, is a sergeant in UNIT, appearing in "Doctor Who and the Silurians" (1970). He served under Brigadier Lethbridge-Stewart and Captain Hawkins when UNIT were called in to investigate unusual incidents at Wenley Moor nuclear research facility. He was placed in charge of monitoring the facility's head of security Major Baker at the base's sickbay, but was knocked out by Baker. He and Hawkins were later drawn into the adjoining cave systems, where Hart was killed by one of the Silurians.

Captain Hawkins
Captain Hawkins, played by Paul Darrow, fights against the Silurians under the Brigadier at the Wenley Moor Nuclear Research Facility before being killed by the Young Silurian when he comes to Lethbridge-Stewart's rescue in the Third Doctor serial Doctor Who and the Silurians (1970). According to the Doctor Who: Missing Adventures novel The Scales of Injustice (1996) by Gary Russell, his first name is Sam.

Sergeant Henderson

Sergeant Henderson, played by Ray Barron, is a sergeant in UNIT, appearing in "The Seeds of Doom" (1976). With the insane Harrison Chase having activated the Krynoid at his estate, trapping Sarah Jane Smith and mercenary Scorby inside, the Fourth Doctor and Henderson battled their way in to rescue the pair using canisters of pesticide to fight the killer plant. They were successful in breaking through but soon afterwards Henderson was attacked by Chase, knocked out and placed in his composter, pulverising the unconscious soldier.

Major Husak

Major Husak, played by Paul Tomany, is a Czech major in UNIT, appearing in "Battlefield" (1989). After the sorceress Morgaine threatened a UNIT missile convoy Husak was charged with evacuating the residents of nearby Carbury. He and his men found the civilians uncooperative until the Seventh Doctor was able to use hypnotism to make them comply.

J

Jac
Jac, played by Jaye Griffiths, is a UNIT operative, who appears in "The Magician's Apprentice" and "The Zygon Invasion". She is seemingly killed when tricked into a Zygon lair by a duplicate of Clara Oswald.

Dr. Martha Jones

After her adventures with the Doctor, Martha Jones codename "Greyhound 6", becomes a medical doctor, and subsequently a Medical Officer for UNIT (revealed during an appearance on the spin-off series Torchwood). She contacts the Doctor so he could help UNIT in the episode "The Sontaran Stratagem" (2008). She becomes trusted enough in UNIT to be given the Osterhagen Key, part of a mechanism for a program to destroy Earth.

L

Lieutenant Lavel

Lieutenant Lavel, played by Dorota Rae, is a French lieutenant in UNIT, appearing in "Battlefield" (1989). An experienced helicopter pilot, she was charged with picking up the reactivated Brigadier Lethbridge-Stewart and flying him to Carbury where a crisis was brewing. However, the sorceress Morgaine was able to shoot the helicopter down. Lavel was able to make a crash-landing that both she and her passenger survived, but injured her leg. While the Brigadier set off to link up with the Seventh Doctor Lavel went to the nearby pub to phone for help. She found Mordred there and drew her pistol, only to be surprised by Morgaine - who was able to absorb all of Lavel's knowledge of UNIT and vaporised the lieutenant.

Brigadier Alistair Gordon Lethbridge-Stewart

Brigadier Alistair Gordon Lethbridge-Stewart (later Sir Alistair Gordon Lethbridge-Stewart) is a founder of UNIT and the original commander of UNIT's British contingent. During the Doctor's exile on Earth, he hires the Doctor as his Scientific Advisor. He was the father of Kate Lethbridge-Stewart, another UNIT commander.

Kate Lethbridge-Stewart

M

Colonel Mace
Colonel Mace is the commanding officer of a large contingent of UNIT, appearing in "The Sontaran Stratagem" / "The Poison Sky" (2008). He originally seems to view the Doctor as a superior officer, saluting him and taking his orders; however, the two clash and Mace begins to be irritated by the Doctor's manner and repeated casual dismissals of him and UNIT, while simultaneously irritating the Doctor through his overtly militaristic manner and insistence on a combat solution to the situation brought on by the Sontarans (Although both agree that the presence of 'Sir Alistair' would be of great assistance at this time).

Despite repeatedly being told UNIT could not face the Sontarans, he organises the troops for an assault on a Sontaran position, telling the Doctor he is not listening any more, and rallies the troops with a speech about how they would show "every passing alien with an axe to grind" to not mock them and see "what the human race is capable of". He even manages to impress the Doctor by having the Valiant clear away the poison gas surrounding the factory. He then successfully leads the recapture of the area, managing to personally kill the Sontaran second-in-command, Commander Skorr.

In the Torchwood serial Children of Earth (2009), John Frobisher and Colonel Oduya discuss Mace's posting in Vancouver. There is also a reference to Colonel Mace's posting in Vancouver in the Eleventh Doctor novel The Forgotten Army (2010).

Captain Erisa Magambo

Captain Erisa Magambo is the UNIT officer in Donna Noble's parallel universe, working with Rose Tyler to restore the correct universe in the 2008 episode "Turn Left". Her UNIT team helps construct a time machine from the TARDIS to send Donna back into the past.

Magambo returns in the 2009 episode "Planet of the Dead", this time on a non-parallel Earth, as a senior officer of a UNIT patrol. She leads a team of UNIT soldiers and Doctor Malcolm Taylor who were investigating a wormhole which was, unbeknownst to them, created by the deadly Swarm. Taylor and Magambo aid the Doctor's attempt to return to planet Earth from San Helios from the Earth side of the wormhole; however, when the Doctor refuses to give full details of the impending Swarm, she considers shutting the wormhole down to save the planet. Malcolm refuses to shut the wormhole without the Doctor coming back through and resists even under the threat of Magambo shooting him. Yet the Doctor was able to come back through with the aid of the modified 200 Bus and Magambo leads her troops in destroying the three Swarm aliens that come through the wormhole before its closure. After thanking the Doctor and bringing his TARDIS back to him (apparently it had been found in the gardens of Buckingham Palace), she comments on having to clear up the mess, to which the Doctor refused to help in the paperwork.

Captain James Munro

Captain James "Jimmy" Munro is a captain in UNIT, appearing in "Spearhead from Space" (1970). He was Brigadier Lethbridge-Stewart's right-hand man during the Autons' first invasion attempt, overseeing the recovery of Nestene meteorites from Oxley Woods. Munro spotted the TARDIS and the recently-regenerated Third Doctor during the search and oversaw his transfer to a nearby hospital. He was later unable to prevent an Auton duplicate of the regular army's Major-General Scobie from retrieving part of the Nestenes, but joined the Brigadier in the climactic assault on the aliens' base at the Auto Plastics factory.

Munro appeared in only a single television story, but later appeared in the spin-off novels The Scales of Injustice and The Devil Goblins from Neptune. The latter confirmed his first name as "James", Lethbridge-Stewart having referred to him as "Jimmy" in the TV series.

O

Sergeant Osgood
Sergeant Osgood, played by Alec Linstead, serves in Devil's End as UNIT's Technical Adviser, during the Master's interference there, as seen in the Third Doctor story The Dæmons (1971). He fights against Azal and Bok. He has the unenviable task of trying to build a device designed by the Doctor to be used against Azal. According to the Doctor Who: Missing Adventures novel The Eye of the Giant (1996) by Christopher Bulis, his first name is Tom.

Petronella Osgood
Petronella Osgood, played by Ingrid Oliver, is a UNIT scientist and assistant to Kate Stewart in "The Day of the Doctor" (2013). She wears a long, knitted scarf of many colours, reminiscent of the Fourth Doctor's scarf, and suffers from a respiratory ailment for which she uses an inhaler when over-excited. In "The Day of the Doctor", she comes to be impersonated by a Zygon, and the two get along rather well, which they keep secret from the other Humans and Zygons. Osgood returns, working with Kate Stewart and the Twelfth Doctor, in the episode "Death in Heaven" (2014), wearing a bow tie reminiscent of the Eleventh Doctor and Converse reminiscent of the Tenth Doctor. She is shown to be eager to please the Doctor and admires him. The Twelfth Doctor hints that he might consider making her a companion, but she is disintegrated by Missy in "Death in Heaven"; Osgood displayed a great deal of self-control as she near-calmly tried persuading Missy to spare her with logical explanations.

P

Corporal Palmer
Corporal Palmer, played by Denys Palmer, is one of Brigadier Lethbridge-Stewart's subordinates at UNIT. When the Time Lord Omega (Doctor Who) sent creatures to attack UNIT HQ in order to kidnap the Third Doctor the Corporal was left with the unenviable task of leading the UNIT counter-attack as both Brigadier Lethbridge-Stewart and Sergeant Benton were trapped inside. However, after capturing their prey the creatures left, taking much of the HQ with them to the surprise of Palmer and the surviving UNIT troops.

Captain Marian Price
Captain Marian Price first appeared in the background in "The Sontaran Stratagem" (2008) and was introduced fully in "The Poison Sky" (2008). She is in charge of monitoring systems and reports on how the planet was coping under the Sontaran gas, and controls the launching of UNIT-coordinated nuclear weaponry. After the Doctor clears the atmosphere with an atmospheric converter, she kisses Colonel Mace in excitement, only to remember herself afterward and awkwardly turns away. Like Colonel Mace she salutes the Doctor upon meeting him. Her collar dogs indicate that she is a member of the Royal Engineers.

S

General Sanchez
Lieutenant General Sanchez, played by Michael Brandon, is the American officer commanding UNIT's Manhattan base in "The Stolen Earth" (2008). His authority includes oversight of Project Indigo, and he directs Martha Jones to use the Sontaran-based technology to find the Doctor. He also entrusts her with one of five Osterhagen Keys for use in case that search failed. Following Martha's escape it is heavily implied that he is exterminated by the Daleks. His right-sleeve shoulder patch shows that he formerly served in a combat theatre with the 82nd Airborne Division.

Years later, a photograph of the late LTG Sanchez with Dr Jones hangs on a bulletin board in UNIT's Black Archive in the Tower of London during the tenure of Kate [Lethbridge]-Stewart as Chief Scientific Officer.

Dr. Elizabeth Shaw

Originally drafted as Scientific Advisor, Dr. Elizabeth Shaw accepts the position of Assistant when the Third Doctor took the job of Scientific Advisor.

Sarah Jane Smith

Sarah Jane Smith is an investigative journalist who becomes a UNIT associate by way of her companion relationship with the Third, Fourth, Tenth and Eleventh Doctors. She first gains access to UNIT in the serial The Time Warrior (1973–74) by posing as her aunt and foster mother, the famous virologist Dr. Lavinia Smith—a guise through which the Third Doctor immediately sees, as he had read papers which Lavinia published when Sarah Jane was but a young child. Sarah Jane maintains contact with, and receives support from, senior UNIT personnel well after leaving their employ.

Kate Stewart
Kate Stewart, sometimes known as Kate Lethbridge-Stewart, is the Chief Scientific Officer and de facto leader of UNIT's United Kingdom contingent in the 2010s. She first appears in "The Power of Three" (2012), introduced by Chris Chibnall, before returning in fiftieth  anniversary special "The Day of the Doctor" (2013) and subsequently recurring during the Twelfth and Thirteenth Doctor's eras.

Kate is the daughter of Brigadier Lethbridge-Stewart (Nicholas Courtney). The character was created for the unofficial spin-off videos Downtime (1995) and Dæmos Rising (2004), in which she was played by Beverley Cressman. She is depicted as a single mother to Gordon Lethbridge-Stewart, who to date has not been referred to in Doctor Who.

Dr. Harry Sullivan

Dr. Harry Sullivan, a Surgeon-Lieutenant in the Royal Navy, is a medical officer in UNIT at the time of the Doctor's third regeneration and his companion for several adventures.

T

Corporal Tracy
Corporal Tracy, played by Geoffrey Cheshire, fights against the Cybermen in the Second Doctor serial The Invasion (1968). According to the Doctor Who: Missing Adventures novel The Scales of Injustice (1996) by Gary Russell, his first name is Jack.

W

Private Wyatt

Private Wyatt, played by Derek Ware, is a private in UNIT who appeared in "Inferno" (1970). He served under Brigadier Lethbridge-Stewart and Sergeant Benton as part of the unit charged with security at the Project Inferno drilling sight. After worker Harry Slocum was turned into a Primord by the by-product of the drilling Wyatt was among the troops who tried to bring the mutant down. While he succeeded in killing Slocum he was infected and turned into a Primord himself and attempted to attack the Third Doctor before falling to his death from a cooling tower. A mirror-universe version of Wyatt deployed by the Republic Security Force met a similar fate shortly after the Third Doctor's arrival, being shot by Platoon Under-Leader Benton.

Actor Derek Ware was a regular stunt arranger and performer for the series at the time, and appeared as unnamed UNIT privates in both the preceding story "The Ambassadors of Death" and the following story "Terror of the Autons".

Y

Captain Mike Yates

Captain Mike Yates was Brigadier Lethbridge-Stewart's assistant for several adventures during the Third Doctor's tenure with UNIT.

Z

Sergeant Zbrigniev
Sergeant Zbrigniev, played by Robert Jezek, is a Polish sergeant in UNIT, appearing in "Battlefield" (1989). He initially served under Brigadier Lethbridge-Stewart before the latter's retirement and knew of UNIT's mysterious scientific advisor known only as the Doctor and his ability to change his appearance. As such when the Seventh Doctor and Ace arrived at a UNIT missile convoy near Lake Vortigen he allowed them through to see commanding officer Brigadier Bambera despite the pair having passes for the Third Doctor and Liz Shaw, much to his superior's irritation.

See also
 List of Torchwood personnel

References

UNIT
UNIT Personnel